Diether Dehm (full name Jörg-Diether Wilhelm Dehm-Desoi; born 3 April 1950) is a German singer-songwriter, music producer and left-wing politician.  He is currently a member of the Left Party, and has previously been a member of the Social Democratic Party of Germany and the PDS.

Early life and education 
Dehm was born in Frankfurt on 3 April 1950. His father Otto Dehm was a mechanic, and played football for FSV Frankfurt, and his mother Inge (née Schulz) was a clerk. He studied remedial education, graduating in 1972, and receiving a doctorate in 1975.

Career as songwriter and music producer 
Dehm performed as a singer-songwriter in the 1960s under the pseudonym Lerryn, a portmanteau of his nickname, Larry, and Lenin. In 1971, he founded  ('Songs in the Park'), a summer festival showcasing singer-songwriters, and organised  ('Rock Against the Right Wing') events.

Dehm produced, wrote and played on Dutch folk rock band Bots's album  ('Stand Up'). Dehm, using the pseudonym N. Heirell, collaborated with Klaus Lage to write the song  ('1000 and 1 Night'), which reached number five on the German singles charts in September 1984.

In 1988, Dehm wrote a new party anthem for the SPD, titled .

In the 1990s, Dehm wrote the screenplay for the musical film , starring Katharina Witt; Dehm had been Witt's manager for a time.

Stasi activities 
In 1970–1971, Dehm was recruited by the East German Stasi secret service, and both he and his wife Christa Desoi became unofficial collaborators (IMs). Dehm used the codename Willy. His most notable work for the Stasi came in 1976, after dissident East German songwriter Wolf Biermann was exiled while in West Germany. Dehm became Biermann's manager, and reported on Biermann's activities. According to Stasi files, Dehm also reported on, among other subjects, activities of the SPD and certain West German artists, and goings-on at the University of Frankfurt. In 1996, a court ruled that it was legal to refer to Dehm as a Stasi informer.

Political career 
Dehm was a member of the SPD from 1966 to 1998, serving as a member of the Bundestag for a short time in 1994. He became a member of the PDS in 1998, and was elected one of its deputy chairs in 1999. He won re-election to that position twice, but lost when he ran for a fourth term in 2003. 

From 2004 to 2010, Dehm was state chairman for Lower Saxony in the Left Party. He has been a Left Party member of the Bundestag since 2005.

Controversies 
In 2016, it was revealed that Dehm had hired former Red Army Faction terrorist Christian Klar to perform work on his website. His employment of Klar was disclosed when Dehm attempted to obtain clearance for him to work inside the Bundestag building.

References

External links 
Personal homepage

Members of the Bundestag for Lower Saxony
Members of the Bundestag for Hesse
1950 births
Living people
Members of the Bundestag 2017–2021
Members of the Bundestag 2013–2017
Members of the Bundestag 2005–2009
Members of the Bundestag 1990–1994
Members of the Bundestag for The Left